The Little Welsh Girl is a 1920 British silent drama film directed by Fred Paul and starring Christine Silver, Humberston Wright and Booth Conway.

Cast
 Christine Silver as Ellen Lloyd  
 Humberston Wright as Cedri Lloyd  
 Booth Conway as Peter the fiddler  
 Adelaide Grace as Mrs. Lloyd 
 Daphne Grey as Dylis Moran  
 Robert Michaelis as Rhys Bowen 
 Dorothy Ardley as Tessie Dunbar

References

Bibliography
 Low, Rachael. History of the British Film, 1918-1929. George Allen & Unwin, 1971.

External links
 

1920 films
1920 drama films
British drama films
British silent feature films
Films directed by Fred Paul
British black-and-white films
1920s English-language films
1920s British films
Silent drama films